James L. Gordon (October 13, 1813 – December 7, 1877) was a Virginia lawyer and politician in Louisa County who served two terms in the Virginia House of Delegates. He was the son of U.S. Congressman William F. Gordon, who served in both houses of the Virginia General Assembly and operated plantations using enslaved labor.

References

1813 births
1877 deaths
Virginia lawyers
Members of the Virginia House of Delegates
People from Louisa County, Virginia